Vittorio Giannini (October 19, 1903 – November 28, 1966) was an American neoromantic composer of operas, songs, symphonies, and band works.

Life and work
Giannini was born in Philadelphia on October 19, 1903. He began as a violinist under the tutelage of his mother Antonietta Briglia; he would go on to study violin and composition at the Milan Conservatory on scholarship, and then to take his graduate degree at the Juilliard School. He returned to Juilliard to teach, moving on to the Manhattan School of Music and the Curtis Institute of Music. His students included Herbie Hancock, Nicolas Flagello, David Amram, Mark Bucci, Alfred Reed, Anthony Iannaccone, M. William Karlins, Irwin Swack, John Corigliano, Adolphus Hailstork, Rolande Maxwell Young, Thomas Pasatieri, Avraham Sternklar, Mary Lynn Twombly, and Nancy Bloomer Deussen. Giannini was the founder and first president of the North Carolina School of the Arts in 1965, which he envisioned as a type of Juilliard of the South, bringing artists such as cellist Irving Klein and violinist Ruggiero Ricci to teach there. He remained there until his death in 1966.

Giannini's father, Ferruccio Giannini, was an opera singer and founder of the Verdi Opera House in Philadelphia, as were as his two sisters. Euphemia Giannini Gregory taught Voice at the Curtis Institute for 40 years counting among her students the opera divas Anna Moffo and Judith Blegen. In fact, it was his sister, Dusolina Giannini, who was a pivotal figure in the success of his operas. Dusolina was a dramatic soprano and prima donna who played such roles as Aida and Donna Anna throughout Europe, until moving to the United States to sing with the Metropolitan Opera and finally to spend her remaining years teaching. Her career was already well underway when Vittorio wished to premiere his first opera, Lucedia and it was her influence that led to its production in 1934. Four years later she would create the role of Hester Prynne in his opera from Nathaniel Hawthorne's The Scarlet Letter (adapted by Karl Flaster). Both operas would be successful, as would most of his later operas (though two, Casanova and Christus, remain unperformed).

His partnership with poet Karl Flaster was a fruitful one. In addition to his work on The Scarlet Letter, Flaster was the librettist for several of Giannini's operas, including Lucedia and The Harvest. Also, Flaster collaborated with Giannini on many of his most successful art songs, including "Tell Me, Oh Blue Blue Sky"; many of these songs are now staples of vocal recitalists' repertoire.

Though it was initially his vocal and operatic works that earned him greatest renown, Giannini also composed seven symphonies (only the last five were numbered), concerti, and chamber music. During the last eight years of his life he composed five works for wind band and, ironically, today they are his most widely performed compositions. One of them, his Symphony No. 3 (1958) has become a staple of the band repertoire. Despite the wide range of his output, little of his music is in the active repertoire. However, today a representative sample of all aspects of his work is available on recording.

Giannini died in New York City on November 28, 1966, at the age of 63.

Selected works

 Stabat mater (1922), SATB and orchestra
 "Tell Me, O Blue, Blue Sky" (1927), voice/piano
 String Quartet (1930)
 Suite (1931), orchestra
 Piano Quintet (1932)
 Lucedia (1934), opera, libretto K. Flaster
 Piano Concerto (1935)
 Symphony ‘In memoriam Theodore Roosevelt’ (1935)
 Organ Concerto (1937)
 Triptych (1937), soprano choir and strings
 IBM Symphony (1937), orchestra
 Requiem (1937), choir and orchestra
 The Scarlet Letter (1938), opera, libretto Flaster after Nathaniel Hawthorne
 Beauty and the Beast (1938), radio opera in one act
 Blennerhassett (1939), radio opera in one act
 Sonata No. 1 (1940), violin and piano
 "Sing to My Heart a Song" (c. 1942), voice/piano
 Sonata No. 2 (1944), violin and piano
 Variations on a Cantus firmus (1947), piano
 The Taming of the Shrew (1950), opera, libretto by Giannini and D. Fee after Shakespeare
 Symphony No. 1 (1950)
 Divertimento No. 1 (1953), orchestra
 Symphony No. 2 (1955), orchestra
 Prelude and Fugue (1955), string orchestra
 Fantasia for Band (1963), band
 Preludium and Allegro (1958), symphonic band
 Symphony No. 3 (1958), symphonic band
 Symphony No. 4 (1959), orchestra
 The Medead (1960), soprano and orchestra
 The Harvest (1961), opera, libretto Flaster
 Divertimento No. 2 (1961), orchestra
 Antigone (1962), soprano and orchestra
 Psalm cxxx (1963), bass/cello and orchestra
 Sonata for Flute and Piano (1964), flute/piano
 Variations and Fugue (1964), symphonic band
 Symphony No. 5 (1965)
 Servant of Two Masters (1966), opera, libretto B. Stambler, after C. Goldoni

Footnotes

References

Further reading

External links
 Sound samples at walter-simmons.com
 North Carolina School of the Arts history

1903 births
1966 deaths
20th-century classical composers
American male classical composers
American classical composers
Manhattan School of Music faculty
Neoromantic composers
American opera composers
Male opera composers
Musicians from Philadelphia
Milan Conservatory alumni
Juilliard School alumni
Juilliard School faculty
Curtis Institute of Music faculty
North Carolina School of the Arts faculty
American people of Italian descent
20th-century American composers
Classical musicians from Pennsylvania
20th-century American male musicians